Cyamops is a genus of flies.

Species  
 Cyamops alessandrae Mathis & Sueyoshi, 2011
 Cyamops americus  Baptista & Mathis, 1994
 Cyamops australicus Hennig, 1969
 Cyamops banvaneue Baptista & Mathis, 2000
 Cyamops buenorum Baptista & Mathis, 1994
 Cyamops claudiensis Khoo, 1984
 Cyamops colombianus Baptista & Mathis, 1994
 Cyamops crosbyi Mathis & Sueyoshi, 2011
 Cyamops dayi Khoo, 1984
 Cyamops delta Khoo, 1984
 Cyamops fasciatus Baptista & Mathis, 1994
 Cyamops femobrunneus Grimaldi, 2009
 Cyamops femoctenidius Grimaldi, 2009
 Cyamops femoratus Baptista & Mathis, 2000
 Cyamops fiji Baptista & Mathis, 2000
 Cyamops freidbergi Baptista & Mathis, 2000
 Cyamops fumipennis Papp, 2006
 Cyamops funkae Baptista & Mathis, 2000
 Cyamops halteratus Sabrosky, 1958
 Cyamops hotei Sueyoshi, 2004
 Cyamops imitatus Sturtevant, 1954
 Cyamops kaplanae Baptista & Mathis, 2000
 Cyamops laos Baptista & Mathis, 2000
 Cyamops micronesicus Baptista & Mathis, 2000
 Cyamops nebulosus Melander, 1913
 Cyamops neotropicus Hennig, 1969
 Cyamops nigeriensis Baptista & Mathis, 2000
 Cyamops papuensis Baptista & Mathis, 2000
 Cyamops pectinatus Khoo, 1984
 Cyamops sabroskyi Baptista & Mathis, 1996
 Cyamops samoensis Baptista & Mathis, 2000
 Cyamops truncatus Khoo, 1984

References

External links 
 

 
Taxa named by Axel Leonard Melander
Schizophora genera